The arid thicket rat (Grammomys aridulus) is a species of rodent in the family Muridae.
It is found only in Sudan.
Its natural habitat is subtropical or tropical dry shrubland. This species is currently listed on the "Nearly Threatened" list in its ranking of endangerment. Offspring of this species are commonly referred to as "kittens" or "pups". The female is referred to as a "doe", while the male is referred to as a "buck". These creatures commonly roam in groups, called a "horde", "pack", or "storm".

References

 website of everything

Endemic fauna of Sudan
Grammomys
Rodents of Africa
Mammals described in 1923
Taxa named by Oldfield Thomas
Taxa named by Martin Hinton
Taxonomy articles created by Polbot